The name Candia can refer to:

People
 The House of Candia, a noble family from Savoy (14th-16th)
 Alfredo Ovando Candía, 56th president of Bolivia 
 Cecilia Maria de Candia, British-Italian writer
 César di Candia, Uruguayan journalist and writer
 Christian di Candia, Uruguayan politician, Mayor of Montevideo
 Elia del Medigo de Candia (1458–1493), philosopher and Talmudist 
 Giovanni Matteo Mario, opera singer, Italian marquis Giovanni de Candia
 Giulia Grisi, opera singer, Italian marchese Juliette de Candia
 José Pedro Montero de Candia, former president of Paraguay
 Joseph Solomon Delmedigo de Candia (1591–1655), scientist and philosopher
 Pedro de Candia, Greek explorer of the Americas

Places
 The Venetian name for Heraklion, Crete, or the island itself, used until the 20th century in English
 Kingdom of Candia, the island of Crete as a colony of the Republic of Venice
 Candia Canavese, comune in Italy
 Candia Lomellina, comune in Italy
 Candia, New Hampshire, town in the United States

Companies
 Candia (vehicles), a Greek agricultural machinery manufacturer